Wheely, also released as Wheely: Fast and Hilarious is a 2018 Malaysian 3D computer-animated comedy film written and directed by Yusry Abd Halim as his first animated film. It was released in Malaysia on 16 August 2018. Critically, the film received negative reviews, with critics calling it a mockbuster of Pixar Animation Studios's film Cars.

Plot
After a really bad crash, Wheely was demoted from a 3-time rookie racer to a downtown cabbie with a mountain of debt and a bruised ego. The cause of the accident is no other than Putt Putt, his philosophical/Feng Shui practitioner fan turned to-best friend. Everything was fine until Wheely fell "head-over-wheels" over Bella, a supermodel from the upper echelons of society. To make things worse...she's got a boyfriend! Luckily for Wheely, Bella finds his street smart, ghetto-like, funny-guy character appealing.... but just before he gets the chance to get to know her better, her stuck-up boyfriend Ben, gets in the way. And that's not all.... Wheely's faced with an even bigger problem when his dream girl gets "car-napped" by a global syndicate masterminded by an monstrous 18-wheeler truck, Kaiser.

Cast 
Ogie Banks as Wheely, a shy and good-hearted yellow Mitsubishi Evo that suffered a fatal racing accident, the main protagonist
Gavin Yap as Putt Putt, a green Piaggio Vespa, the Wheely's best friend
Frances Lee as Bella, an attractive red Alfa Romeo GT
Thomas Pang as Ben, a dark green Buick XP2000, the Bella's boyfriend
Jay Sheldon as Frank, a rusty Ford Econoline with Frankenstein features that is known as a cardiologist. Sheldon also voices Ryan the Commentator, a blue helicopter who narrates Wheely's race
Brock Powell as Kaiser, an evil blue Volvo FH, who is the leader of a luxury "car-napping" syndicate
Raymond Orta as Parmo, a Mini Cooper, one of Kaiser's henchmen
Armando Valdes-Kennedy as Rumble, a Chevrolet Camaro, one of Kaiser's henchmen
Tamiyka White as Momma, a Jamaican-accented orange VW Beetle, the Wheely's mother
Barbara Goodson as Sergeant Street, a Ford Crown Victoria, that takes care of Gasket City
Chris Jai Alex as Crank, a ship that transports Kaiser
Khairil Mokhzani Bahar as Joe Flo, a red 1991 Nissan Silvia
Gavin Yap as Brad, an orange and white 2002 Subaru Impreza WRX STi. Yap also voices Ryan the Commentator, a red helicopter who narrates Wheely's race 
 Joe Murray as Royston, a wealthy blue 1960 Jaguar Mark 2 who is Ben's father
 Ghafir Akbar as the Director, a unnamed purple Willys model jeep who directs a commercial that Bella is acting
 Diong Chae Lian as Amy a yellow Daewoo Matiz who is Wheely's biggest fan

Production
Yusry Abdul Halim came up with the idea for the film in 2014 under the name of KL Taxi. But when we it get marketed the internationally buyers didn’t get the "KL" name. So Yusry immediately changed the title to Wheely.

His brother Norman, added that the car photos went through various inspirations for the character designs, with the concept being expanded on the storyline. “We got two British writers who sneaked into the KRU Creative studios in Ipoh to work on the script but we eventually realized that the humour and sensibilities don't fit intro our movie. We wanted the movie to be have American charm rather than British, which explains why Wheely is not red and white like regular taxis in Malaysia “Yes but you know, back in the 80's our taxis were yellow and black, so it’s still Malaysian in that sense,” said Norman. With half of the animation handled at Invector Heads studio in India, KRU produced stereoscopic 3D version exclusive for Russia.

Release and reception 
Wheely was released in Malaysia on 16 August 2018, and had a worldwide gross of $1,340,799, the highest grossing country being Poland with $348,806.

Critically, the film received negative reviews, with critics calling it a mockbuster of Pixar Animation Studios's film Cars. But according to Norman Abdul Halim, the movie is not a rip-off of Cars "it has its own unique characters, designs, plot, storyline and flavour."

References

External links 

2018 films
Malaysian animated films
Malaysian auto racing films
Malaysian 3D films
Mockbuster films
2018 comedy films
2018 computer-animated films
2010s children's animated films
2010s children's comedy films
English-language Malaysian films
Animated films about auto racing
Animated films about automobiles
Films about kidnapping
2018 direct-to-video films
KRU Studios films